Anssi Salmela (born 13 August 1984) is a Finnish former professional ice hockey defenceman who played in the National Hockey League (NHL) with the New Jersey Devils and Atlanta Thrashers.

Playing career
Undrafted, Salmela's professional career started in the 2003–04 season with Finnish SM-liiga side Tappara, where he made his debut on 24 January 2004. His place was settled in Tappara for another year, but the next year he was transferred to Pelicans. In 2007, he moved back to Tappara.

Salmela was a member of Team Finland that won a bronze medal in the World Under-20 Championship. He made his debut for the senior national team in the 2008 IIHF World Championships held in Canada in 2008. On 22 May 2008, he signed a one-year, two-way contract with the New Jersey Devils of the NHL.

In the 2008–09 season, Salmela made his NHL and North American debut with New Jersey in the season opener on 10 October 2008, in a 2–1 win over the New York Islanders. However, Salmela spent the majority of his time with the Devils affiliate the Lowell Devils of the American Hockey League (AHL). On 2 March 2009, Salmela was traded by the Devils to the Atlanta Thrashers for Niclas Hävelid. In his second game with the Thrashers Salmela scored his first career NHL goal in a 5–1 win against the Washington Capitals on 16 March 2009.

On 4 February 2010, Salmela was traded back to the New Jersey Devils along with Ilya Kovalchuk for Johnny Oduya, Niclas Bergfors, Patrice Cormier and a 1st round draft pick in the 2010 NHL Entry Draft. Salmela scored only one goal in 2010–11, but it was a big one. On 12 March, he scored an overtime goal against Al Montoya to give the Devils a 3–2 victory over the New York Islanders. Salmela did not receive a qualifying offer from the Devils following the 2010–11 season, making him an unrestricted free agent. He signed a two-year contract with Avangard Omsk in the Kontinental Hockey League (KHL), reportedly for US$1.5 million per season, on 15 July 2011. When his contract was up at the end of the 2012–13 season, he moved to Sweden, penning a deal with Modo Hockey, before transferring to fellow SHL side HV71 during the 2013-14 campaign. In the following two years, he played for two more SHL clubs, Färjestad BK and Brynäs IF.

He was signed by newly founded KHL side Red Star Kunlun from Beijing, China, in July 2016 and left the team by mutual consent in November 2016.

On 5 June 2018, Salmela agreed to a one-year contract with EHC Biel of the National League (NL). On 4 December 2018, Salmela was signed to an early one-year contract extension by Biel through the end of the 2019–20 season.

Career statistics

Regular season and playoffs

International

Awards and honours

References

External links
 

1984 births
Albany Devils players
Atlanta Thrashers players
Avangard Omsk players
EHC Biel players
Brynäs IF players
Chicago Wolves players
Dinamo Riga players
Färjestad BK players
Finnish ice hockey defencemen
HV71 players
HC Kunlun Red Star players
Ilves players
Linköping HC players
Living people
Lowell Devils players
Modo Hockey players
New Jersey Devils players
People from Nokia, Finland
Lahti Pelicans players
Tappara players
Undrafted National Hockey League players
Sportspeople from Pirkanmaa